Yven Rochild Victor Moyo (born 15 March 1992) is a professional footballer who plays as a left midfielder for Belgian Division 2 club RE Durbuy. Born in France, he is a former Republic of the Congo international.

Club career
Born in Orléans, France, Moyo began his career at Sochaux. He signed a four-year contract with Newcastle United on 29 September 2010.

In 2017, Moyo left Laval. In January 2022, he joined Belgian club RE Durbuy.

International career 
Moyo made his international debut for Congo on 11 November 2011 in a 5–0 victory over São Tomé and Príncipe in a 2014 FIFA World Cup qualifier.

References

External links
Newcastle United profile

1992 births
Living people
Footballers from Orléans
French footballers
French sportspeople of Republic of the Congo descent
Association football midfielders
Republic of the Congo footballers
Republic of the Congo international footballers
France youth international footballers
FC Sochaux-Montbéliard players
Newcastle United F.C. players
Stade Lavallois players
Expatriate footballers in England
Republic of the Congo expatriate sportspeople in England
Expatriate footballers in Albania
Republic of the Congo expatriate sportspeople in Albania
Expatriate footballers in Lithuania
Republic of the Congo expatriate sportspeople in Lithuania
Expatriate footballers in Belgium
Republic of the Congo expatriate sportspeople in Belgium
French expatriate footballers
French expatriate sportspeople in England
French expatriate sportspeople in Albania
French expatriate sportspeople in Lithuania
French expatriate sportspeople in Belgium
Black French sportspeople